Girls in the Sun (translit. Koritsia ston Ilio) is a 1968 Greek drama film directed by Vasilis Georgiadis. The film was selected as the Greek entry for the Best Foreign Language Film at the 42nd Academy Awards, but was not accepted as a nominee. The film was nominated for the Golden Globe Award for Best Foreign Language Film.

Plot
A young English tourist called Annabel meets a Greek shepherd during her vacation on a Greek Island. On their first encounter in a field, the shepherd approaches Annabel wanting to give her some almonds but scared of his rustic and rough appearance she misunderstands his intentions and runs away. Soon, he is found in prison accused of the supposed rape of Annabel. She regrets overreacting and tries to persuade the authorities to release him. Gradually, they fall in love and after being released from prison he follows her to Athens but she must return home and it seems that their innocent love doesn't have a future.

Cast
 Giannis Voglis as The Shepherd
 Anne Lonnberg as Annabel Stone
 Kostas Bakas as Police Officer
 Miranta Myrat as Mrs. Fragopoulou
 Vangelis Kazan as Hotel Receptionist
 Elpida Braoudaki as Annabel's Friend
 Vagelis Sakainas as Giorgos

Awards

See also
 List of submissions to the 42nd Academy Awards for Best Foreign Language Film
 List of Greek submissions for the Academy Award for Best Foreign Language Film

References

External links
 

1968 films
Greek drama films
1960s Greek-language films
1968 drama films
Films directed by Vasilis Georgiadis